Bernardo Alejandro Bas (22 October 1919 – 2 March 1991) was de facto Federal Interventor of Córdoba, Argentina from June 17, 1970 to February 25, 1971.

References

1919 births
1991 deaths
Governors of Córdoba Province, Argentina
People from Córdoba, Argentina